The vitelline warbler (Setophaga vitellina) is a songbird species in the New World warbler family (Parulidae). It is found in the Cayman Islands and on the Swan Islands in Honduras.

Taxonomy
This species is part of the large New World warbler genus Setophaga. Currently, there are three subspecies described:
S. v. nelsoni, (Bangs, 1919), Swan Islands
S. v. vitellina, (Cory, 1886), Grand Cayman Island
S. v. crawfordi, (Nicoll, 1901), Little Cayman and Cayman Brac
These subspecies differ noticeably in underpart coloration and head patterning. Some taxonomists have considered this species conspecific with the North American prairie warbler. However, a genetic study confirmed its species status, while reaffirming a close relationship between the two species.

Description
This species bears a stark resemblance to the prairie warbler, sharing its streaking on the belly, yellow-green back, and subtle yellow wingbars, differing with the intensity of the black streaks. Its song is a string of 4-5 rising harsh buzzy notes.

Ecology
This species usually occupies dry woodland with considerable scrub, though will tolerate some disturbance, and has begun to occupy more urbanized areas since human arrival.

Status and Conservation
Due to the species small population and range, it is susceptible to habitat destruction, its current foremost threat. However, due to its tolerance of limited human disturbance, the IUCN classifies it as near threatened.

References 

 Raffaele, Herbert; James Wiley, Orlando Garrido, Allan Keith & Janis Raffaele (2003) Birds of the West Indies, Christopher Helm, London.

Birds of Honduras
Birds of the Cayman Islands
Setophaga
Vitelline warbler
Vitelline warbler
Taxonomy articles created by Polbot